Adrián Javier Gunino Duque (born 3 February 1989) is an Uruguayan footballer who plays for Fénix as a right back.

Club career
Born in Montevideo, Gunino made his senior debuts with hometown's Danubio F.C., appearing in four matches during his first campaign, and in further 12 in his second. On 25 July 2009 he was loaned to Boca Juniors, and made his maiden appearance for the club on 3 September, coming on as a first-half substitute in a 1-1 home draw against Newell's Old Boys.

On 20 June 2010 Gunino moved teams and countries again, joining Toulouse FC also in a temporary deal. He made his Ligue 1 debut on 7 August, starting and playing the full 90 minutes in a 2–0 home success over Stade Brestois 29, and finished the campaign with 29 appearances as Les Pitchouns finished eighth.

On 16 August 2011, Gunino signed a one-year deal with C.A. Peñarol, but after being sparingly used (only six matches, 137 minutes of action), he was released in January of the following year, and subsequently moved to Centro Atlético Fénix on 14 February.

On 23 July 2012, Gunino signed a one-year loan contract with a buyout clause for UD Almería. Initially as a backup to Rafita, he appeared in 31 matches during his only season, as the Andalusians were promoted in the play-offs.

On 27 January 2014, he joined Córdoba CF also in a temporary deal. Gunino was also a starter during his six-month spell, as the verdiblancos returned to La Liga after a 42-year absence. On 17 July, his loan was renewed for a further year.

Gunino made his debut in the Spanish top level on 25 August 2014, starting in a 0–2 away loss against Real Madrid.

International career
In 2009 Gunino began playing for the Uruguay U-20 team. He helped the team finish in 3rd place in the 2009 South American Youth Championship.

References

External links
 
 
 
 
 
 

1989 births
Living people
Footballers from Montevideo
Uruguayan footballers
Association football defenders
Uruguayan Primera División players
Danubio F.C. players
Peñarol players
Centro Atlético Fénix players
Argentine Primera División players
Boca Juniors footballers
Ligue 1 players
Toulouse FC players
La Liga players
Segunda División players
UD Almería players
Córdoba CF players
Uruguayan expatriate footballers
Expatriate footballers in Argentina
Expatriate footballers in France
Expatriate footballers in Spain
Uruguay under-20 international footballers
Footballers at the 2011 Pan American Games
Pan American Games medalists in football
Pan American Games bronze medalists for Uruguay
Medalists at the 2011 Pan American Games